Born to the Saddle is a 1929 American silent Western film directed by Joseph Levigard and written by George H. Plympton, George Mitchell and Carl Krusada. The film stars Ted Wells, Duane Thompson, Leo White, Byron Douglas, Merrill McCormick and Nelson McDowell. The film was released on March 10, 1929, by Universal Pictures.

Plot

Cast     
 Ted Wells as Ted Dorgan
 Duane Thompson as Helen Pearson
 Leo White as Clyde Montmorency Wilpenny
 Byron Douglas as John Pearson
 Merrill McCormick as Amos Judd
 Nelson McDowell as Pop Healy

References

External links
 

1929 films
1929 Western (genre) films
Universal Pictures films
American black-and-white films
Silent American Western (genre) films
Films with screenplays by George H. Plympton
1920s English-language films
1920s American films